Marion Municipal Airport  is a city-owned, public-use airport located two nautical miles (4 km) southeast of the central business district of Marion, a city in Marion County, Kansas, United States.

Facilities and aircraft 
Marion Municipal Airport covers an area of 160 acres (65 ha) at an elevation of 1,390 feet (424 m) above mean sea level. It has one asphalt paved runway designated 17/35 which measures 2,573 by 40 feet (784 x 12 m); it also has three turf runways: 3/21 is 2,745 by 95 feet (837 x 29 m); 13/31 is 2,722 by 50 feet (830 x 15 m); 18/36 is 2,310 by 67 feet (704 x 20 m).

For the 12-month period ending November 19, 2009, the airport had 9,024 aircraft operations, an average of 24 per day: 99.7% general aviation and 0.3% military. At that time there were 17 aircraft based at this airport: 94% single-engine and 6% ultralight.

References

External links 
 Airport page at City of Marion website
 Marion Municipal Airport (43K) at Kansas DOT Airport Directory
 Aerial image as of October 1991 from USGS The National Map
 
 

Airports in Kansas
Buildings and structures in Marion County, Kansas